The Valmet L-90 Redigo is a turboprop-powered military basic trainer aircraft and liaison aircraft, a development of Valmet's earlier training aircraft for the Finnish Air Force. The L-90 was the last military aircraft designed and produced in Finland.

Design and development
The prototype, a modified L-80, first flew on February 12, 1985. A second prototype, powered by a Turbomeca TP319 turboprop, was destroyed in an accident in August 1988. A total of 29 production aircraft plus the 2 prototypes were produced. Aermacchi purchased the manufacturing rights in 1996 but never returned the aircraft to production.

The aircraft is of conventional configuration, with retractable tricycle gear and a low wing. The student and instructor sit side-by-side. As is typical with many military trainers, it can also carry light armament for weapons training, or potentially, for use in a close-support role. The Finnish Air Force only used the L-90 as a liaison aircraft.

Operators
 Eritrean Air Force 6 in service as of 2011
 Finnish Air Force, 10 units, the whole fleet retired
 Mexican Navy 7 in service

Specifications (M-290 TP)

See also

References
Notes

Further reading

1980s Finnish military trainer aircraft
M-290
L-90
Aircraft first flown in 1985
Single-engined tractor aircraft
Single-engined turboprop aircraft
Low-wing aircraft